The 1966 Florida gubernatorial election took place on November 8, 1966. During the primary election, the results from the Democratic Party was close among three of the four candidates. Thus, the top two Democrat candidates – incumbent Governor of Florida William "Haydon" Burns and Mayor of Miami Robert King High – competed in a runoff election on May 24, 1966. In an upset outcome, Robert King High was chosen over W. Haydon Burns as the Democratic Gubernatorial nominee. In contrast, the Republican primary was rather uneventful, with businessman Claude Roy Kirk Jr. easily securing the Republican nomination against Richard Muldrew. In the general election, Claude Kirk won by a margin of 55.13%-44.86% against Robert King High, becoming the first Republican Governor of Florida since the Reconstruction Era.

As of 2022, this is the last time that a Republican gubernatorial nominee has carried Broward County.

Background
Democratic Haydon Burns, who won the gubernatorial election in 1964, was up for re-election. Although gubernatorial elections in Florida are normally every four years, the cycle of gubernatorial elections was changed so as not to coincide with presidential election years. Thus, the Governor of Florida elected in 1964 would serve from January 5, 1965 to January 3, 1967, while the next term would last from January 3, 1967 – January 5, 1971.

Democratic nomination

Candidates
 Haydon Burns, incumbent Governor
 Sam Foor
 Robert King High, Mayor of Miami and candidate for Governor in 1964
 Scott Kelly, State Senator from Lakeland and candidate for Governor in 1964

Campaign
In September 1965, a poll with a sample size exceeding 3,000 people indicated Governor Haydon Burns had an approval rating of 75%. However, by March 1966, the Governor's approval rating fell to 56%, due to Burns' alleged dishonesty, lack of integrity, and showing favoritism. In that same "confidential" poll Robert High surprisingly led Haydon Burns by 34%-28.5%, while Scott Kelly received 18.5% and 19% were left undecided. Due to the "stunning" results this poll conducted by Haydon Burns' campaign managers, they attempted to cover up it up. By the end of November, the three major Democratic candidates in 1964 all announced their intention to run for governor in 1966, which were incumbent Governor Haydon Burns, Mayor of Miami Robert King, and State Senator Scott Kelly. Additionally, it was speculated that former Governor Thomas "LeRoy" Collins would also challenge Burns in the primary, but instead ran for United States Senate in 1968. Eventually a fourth person, Tallahassee publisher Sam Foor, decided to enter the race, though he was not considered a "serious contender".

Both the Democratic and Republican primary election took place on May 3, 1966. The results of the Democratic primary were Haydon Burns with 372,451 votes (35.35%), Robert High with 338,281 votes (32.11%), Scott Kelly with 331,580 votes (31.47%), and Sam Foor with 11,343 votes (1.08%). Because none of the four candidates received at a majority of votes, a runoff election was held between Haydon Burns and Robert King, the top two candidates, on May 24, 1966. After the run-off election, Robert High defeated Haydon Burns by a margin of 596,471-509,271 (53.94%-46.065). Thus, Robert King High was the Democratic nominee for the 1966 gubernatorial election in Florida.

Results

Republican nomination

1964 United States Senate nominee Claude Roy Kirk won nomination over his opponent Richard Muldrew.

Results

General election
After a bitter Democratic primary election, defeated incumbent Governor Haydon Burns refused to endorse nominee Robert High. However, High was able to draw endorsements from major Florida newspapers, labor unions, and other Democratic politicians in Florida. High made unpopular proposals, such as a severance tax on phosphate and tightening the sales tax on all products except food and drugs. Republican nominee Claude Kirk promised to veto new taxes and abolish a program calling for several millions of dollars in additional taxation. Kirk also noted that a vote for him would be a vote against inflation and warned voters about the "Johnson–Humphrey-High Administration". The general election campaign was described as "dreary", with a projected voter turnout of less than 65%.

On Election Day – November 8 – Claude Kirk won the general election with 821,190 (55.13%) votes versus Robert High's 668,233 (44.86%) votes. As a result, Claude Kirk became the first Republican elected to the office of Governor of Florida since Ossian B. Hart in 1872. At the time of the election, the Florida Constitution did not include a provision allowing a lieutenant governor. However, after a new state constitution was adopted in 1968, Governor Kirk appointed Ray C. Osborn as Lieutenant Governor of Florida, the first to serve in that office since Milton H. Mabry in 1889.

Results

References

Bibliography

See also
 Democratic Party (United States)
 Republican Party (United States)

1966
Gubernatorial
Florida
November 1966 events in the United States